Bodianus insularis, the island hogfish, is a species of wrasse. 
It is found in the Eastern Atlantic Ocean.

Size

References

insularis
Fish of the Atlantic Ocean

Taxa named by Martin F. Gomon
Taxa named by Roger Lubbock
Fish described in 1980